NVC community H7 (Calluna vulgaris - Scilla verna heath) is one of the heath communities in the British National Vegetation Classification system. It is one of two communities categorised as maritime heaths. 

It is a fairly widespread coastal community. There are five subcommunities.

Community composition
The following eleven constant species are found in this community:
 Heather (Calluna vulgaris)
 Bell Heather (Erica cinerea)
 Sheep's Fescue (Festuca ovina)
 Yorkshire-fog (Holcus lanatus)
 Common Cat's-ear (Hypochaeris radicata)
 Bird's-foot Trefoil (Lotus corniculatus)
 Ribwort Plantain (Plantago lanceolata)
 Sea Plantain (Plantago maritima)
 Tormentil (Potentilla erecta)
 Spring Squill (Scilla verna)
 Wild Thyme (Thymus praecox)

The following rare species are associated with the community:

 Chives (Allium schoenoprasum)
 Purple Milk-vetch (Astragalus danicus)
 Cornish Heath (Erica vagans)
 Portland Spurge (Euphorbia portlandica)
 Hairy Greenweed (Genista pilosa)
 Fringed Rupturewort (Herniaria ciliolata)
 Land Quillwort (Isoetes histrix)
 Spring Sandwort (Minuartia verna)
 Scottish Primrose (Primula scotica)
 Autumn Squill (Scilla autumnalis)
 Spring Squill (Scilla verna)
 Autumn Ladies'-tresses (Spiranthes spiralis)
 Twin-headed Clover (Trifolium bocconei)
 Western Clover (Trifolium occidentale)

Distribution
This community is found all around the coasts of Scotland, western Wales, Devon and Cornwall.

Subcommunities
There are five subcommunities:
 the Armeria maritima subcommunity
 the Viola riviniana subcommunity
 the Erica tetralix subcommunity
 the Empetrum nigrum ssp. nigrum subcommunity
 the Calluna vulgaris subcommunity

References
 Rodwell, J. S. (1991) British Plant Communities Volume 2 - Mires and heaths  (hardback),  (paperback)

H07